Samuel Lawrence Milton (May 4, 1879 – May 15, 1942), nicknamed "Tug", was a professional baseball player who played pitcher in the Major Leagues in 1903 for the St. Louis Cardinals.

External links

1879 births
1942 deaths
Major League Baseball pitchers
St. Louis Cardinals players
Baseball players from Kentucky
St. Joseph Saints players
Rock Island Islanders players
Kansas City Blue Stockings players
Omaha Indians players
Iola Gasbags players
Wichita Jobbers players
Webb City Goldbugs players
Webb City Webfeet players
Little Rock Travelers players
Sapulpa Oilers players
Minor league baseball managers